Henry Grahn Hermunen (Helsinki 1963) is a contemporary artist living in Helsinki, Finland and Stockholm, Sweden.

Biography
He studied at The Academy of Fine Arts, Helsinki Finland between 1996–2001 and received a Master of Fine Arts. During 1998 -2000 he was a scholar at The Royal Institute of Art - Royal University College of Fine Arts in Stockholm Sweden.

Since the late 1990s, he has created large-scale installations consisting of separate techniques or combinations such as: photography, drawings, sculpture, painting, light and sound, dealing with environmental and sociopolitical issues.

In an interview "Art about the beauty in Life", with Ny Tid (Finland) news magazine Henry Grahn Hermunen said: We live in the middle of a worldwide renaissance with global education through the internet. But for example, people work too much to have time to consume what they have. Medias role is crucial - they can obviously make people shrink. Joseph Pulitzer who founded the Pulitzer Prize and who sometimes acted dubiously himself, said a hundred years ago "that a cynical, mercenary and demagogic press will eventually create a people who are just as shabby as themselves".

Henry Grahn Hermunen has exhibited at art venues including Art Forum Berlin, ARCO Madrid and at The Whitechapel Gallery London, as well showing solo exhibitions at Marina Gisich Gallery and at The Hermitage Museum in St. Petersburg.
Swedish newspaper SvD Svenska Dagbladet wrote: Grahn Hermunen is the first North European Contemporary Artist invited to show his exhibition "Water table in a renaissance garden" in one of the halls of The Hermitage, a Museum considered to be one of the world's foremost Institutions.

Visiting the exhibition Marina Chekmareva at The State Hermitage Museum said in an interview to Alexey Sukhorukov from Russia-Culture National TV. "we have been carrying out these combined exhibition - masterclass projects for three years by the most advanced artists not only from Russia but also from abroad"

The fine art of Grahn Hermunen are for example in the collections of Moderna Museet the Museum of Modern Art Stockholm Sweden, Pro Artibus Finland, Hamburger Bahnhof - Museum of Contemporary Art Berlin Germany, MoMA - Museum of Modern Art New York USA, Erarta Museum of Contemporary Art St. Petersburg Russia, and The South Karelian Art Museum Finland.

Henry Grahn Hermunen was invited by Head Curator Larisa Skobkina Golybeva to take part and also curate the North European section to the Celebratory 10th International Dialogues Biennale in Manege -The Main Exhibition Hall of St. Petersburg, Russia 2011.

The artist is represented by Cath Alexandrine Danneskiold-Samsøe Gallery in Denmark, Marina Gisich Gallery in Russia, and Karin Weber-Galerie Mitte in Germany.

Further reading
Germany - Parliament of Saxony "Haltungen" Contemporary Photo Exhibition 
Grahn Hermunen at Saatchi Art Top 10 list as No:2 chosen by Rebecca Wilson (curator) chief curator and vice president of Art Advisory at Saatchi Art the world’s leading online art gallery, based in Los Angeles 
Henry Grahn Hermunen, authors: Mika Hannula (writer), Power Ekroth, Kari Immonen,  
Amy Cheung (Hong Kong artist), Henry Grahn, Valter Kokot (Today: Ingrid Ung), Erkka Nissinen. Handkerchief Production, 
FATAL MOMENTS – images of war in Fine Art. Authors: Leena Räty, Anu Talka, Riitta Kormano, Maija Tanninen-Mattila, Jan Kaila, Marja Ruta, Ismo Kajander, Henry Grahn Hermunen. South Karelia Art Museum, Lappeenranta Finland. 
Manual CC. Instructions for Beginners and Advanced Players. Texts by: Sebastian Cichocki, Andrzej Szczerski, Joanna Warsza and the artists. KRONIKA Museum, Bytom Poland. The ISBN printed in the document (978-83-920614-6-2) is invalid, causing a checksum error.
"Sense and sensibility" , "Fabulous" . Authors: Karin Perers - Kenneth Linder, The VERKET Museum, Avesta Sweden.
Avesta Art Biennale/Annuale, several hundred thousand visitors have seen the exhibitions. With all right, the ambitions are high and match the quality, this year the organizers have attracted names like Roy Andersson, Henry Grahn Hermunen, Eric Dyer and Hanna Beling. DT - Cecilia Ekebjär, 3 June 2011 Sweden.
According to several critics this is maybe the best Avesta Art Biennale/Annuale since the start in 1995. Kerstin Eriksson 14 June 2012 for DD - Dala Demokraten Newspaper, Sweden. 
SR-Swedish Radio Interview, Art does good - Hold that thought exhibition, Kirsi Blomberg 8 Nov 2011 
TS-Turun Sanomat-Newspaper, An international selection in The Ars Nova Museum-Kansainvälinen valikoima Ars Nova -museossa, Jyrki Vuori Turku Finland 18.3.2005.
Kuvas 4. Editors: Vesa Vehviläinen, Tiina Mielonen. Academy of Fine Arts, Helsinki Finland, ISSN 1238-8009
Helsingin Sanomat-Newspaper, The Singing Summerian Installation, Marja-Terttu Kivirinta, 21 May 2001 Finland.
YLE 1 Radioprogram Qualitymarkt, Interview about The Singing Summerian Installation, Jonni Roos, 28.5.2001, Finland.

References

External links 
  of the artist
 

Finnish contemporary artists
Living people
20th-century Finnish painters
21st-century Finnish painters
21st-century male artists
Finnish photographers
20th-century Finnish sculptors
21st-century Finnish sculptors
Finnish expatriates in Sweden
1963 births
Finnish male painters
20th-century Finnish male artists